The 1917 Hawkes Bay by-election was a by-election held in the eastern North Island electorate of  during the 19th New Zealand Parliament, on 8 March 1917.

It was caused by the death of incumbent MP Robert McNab, and was won by fellow party Liberal Party member Sir John Findlay with a majority of 471 votes.

Background
Under the terms of the coalition agreement between Reform and the Liberals a condition was made not to oppose each other in by-elections for deceased or retiring MPs from their own parties. As the deceased MP for this electorate was a Liberal the Reform Party did not contest the seat, and endorsed the Liberal's official candidate as a sign of goodwill and wartime unity. This did not eventuate.

Sir John Findlay was chosen by the Liberal Party to contest the seat, he was a former Legislative Councillor and served in Sir Joseph Ward's cabinet from 1906 to 1911 as Attorney-General and later as Minister of Justice. Former  MP Alfred Fraser previously sought the Liberal nomination, however he retired from the contest, yet 9 votes were still cast for him.

H. Ian Simpson also stood in support of the National Government and was Findlay's only real competition for the seat.

Results
The following table gives the election results:

Findlay held the seat until the next general election and then retired.

References 

Hawke
1917 elections in New Zealand
Politics of the Hawke's Bay Region